Armigatus is an extinct genus of clupeomorph fishes belonging to the order Ellimmichthyiformes. These fishes lived in the Cretaceous (Albian to Turonian, about 103-90 million years ago);  their fossil remains have been found in Mexico, Croatia, the Middle East and North Africa, suggesting the genus ranged across the Tethys Sea.

Etymology
The Latin genus name armigatus, means bearer of armor. Brevissimus signifies "shortest, smallest".

Description
Armigatus has an osteoglossid-like tooth patch, a large foramen in the anterior ceratohyal and a series of subtriangular dorsal scutes, giving rise to their scientific name.

Species
Armigatus brevissimus (Blaineville, 1818), the type species, from Heckel and Hajula of the Sannine Formation in Lebanon. 
Armigatus namourensis (Forey et al., 2003) from Namoura, of the Sannine Formation in Lebanon.
Armigatus alticorpus (Forey et al., 2003) from Namoura and Hakel, of the Sannine Formation in Lebanon.
Armigatus oligodentatus (Vernygora and Murray, 2016) from the Cenomanian/early Turonian Akrabou Formation of Morocco.
Armigatus dalmaticus (Murray et al., 2016) from the Campanian deposits of Dalmatia, Croatia.
Armigatus carrenoae (Alvarado-Ortega et al., 2020) from the Albian Tlayua Formation of Mexico. 
Armigatus felixi (Than-Marchese et al., 2022) from the Albian Tlayua Formation of Mexico.

References

Clupeiformes
Prehistoric ray-finned fish genera
Cretaceous fish